Cyclidia is a genus of moths belonging to the subfamily Cyclidiinae. The genus was erected by Achille Guenée in 1857. Cyclidia is one of two genus in the subfamily Cyclidiinae, the other being Mimozethes. The two genus differ in their genitalia, the male genitalia of the cyclidia is more developed and the female genitalia contain sclerotization, where Mimozethes does not. 

Cyclidia reside in Southeast Asia, specifically in China, India, Indonedia, Japan, Korean Peninsula, Laos, Mayanma, Nepal, Peninsular Malaysia, Thailand, and Vietnam.

Species
 Cyclidia dictyaria Swinhoe, 1899
 Cyclidia diehli Lutz & Kobes, 2002
 Cyclidia fabiolaria Oberthür, 1884
 Cyclidia fractifasciata Leech, 1898
 Cyclidia javana Aurivillius, 1894
 Cyclidia orciferaria Walker, 1860
 Cyclidia pitmani Moore, 1886
 Cyclidia rectificata Walker, 1862
 Cyclidia sericea Warren, 1922
 Cyclidia substigmaria Hübner, 1825

Status unknown
 Cyclidia fuscifusa Seitz, 1934

Former species
 Cyclidia tetraspota Chu & Wang, 1987

References

 , 1987: A contribution to the taxonomy and zoogeography of the Cyclidiidae (Lepidoptera: Geometroidea). Acta Entomologica Sinica 30 (2): 203–211.

Cyclidiinae
Drepanidae genera